Spring Basin Wilderness is a  wilderness area located near the town of Clarno in the U.S. state of Oregon.  It was created by the Omnibus Public Land Management Act of 2009, which was signed into law by President Barack Obama on March 30, 2009.

Bordered by the John Day River, the wilderness comprises rugged cliffs, remote canyons and colorful geologic features.  Common wildlife species in the area include mule deer, golden eagle, prairie falcon, bobcat, California quail, mountain bluebird, and meadowlark.

See also
 List of Oregon Wildernesses
 List of U.S. Wilderness Areas

References

External links
 Spring Basin Wilderness Area - BLM page

IUCN Category Ib
Wilderness areas of Oregon
Protected areas of Wheeler County, Oregon
Protected areas established in 2009
Bureau of Land Management wilderness areas in Oregon
2009 establishments in Oregon